General elections were held in Uganda on 23 February 2006. They were the first multi-party elections since President Yoweri Museveni took over power in 1986, and followed a referendum the previous year on scrapping the ban on party politics.

Museveni ran for a second re-election as the National Resistance Movement (NRM) candidate. His main opponent was the leader of the Forum for Democratic Change, Kizza Besigye. Besigye was arrested on 14 November 2005 on allegations of treason, concealment of treason, and rape. The treason case included his alleged links to the rebel groups, Lord's Resistance Army and People's Redemption Army, and the rape charge referred to an incident in November 1997 allegedly involving the daughter of a friend. The arrest led to demonstrations and riots in Kampala and towns around the country. Pro-Besigye protesters believed the charges were fabricated to stop Besigye from challenging Museveni.

The result of the presidential election was a victory for Museveni, who received 59 percent of the vote; Besigye took 37 percent. In the parliamentary elections the NRM won 213 of the 319 seats.

Campaign
Justice Forum leader Muhammad Kibirige Mayanja and Conservative Party's Ken Lukyamuzi decided not to contest, but said they would support a joint candidate agreed to by the "Group of Six" opposition political parties. Independent candidate Nasser Sebaggala registered, but later decided to quit the presidential race, and asked his supporters to vote for the DP's Kizito.

Conduct
The elections were marred by controversy, with the government accused of intimidating opposition parties.  This included the arrest and detention of Besigye.

Results

President

By district

Parliament

Aftermath
Opposition supporters in Kampala staged some protests but were dispersed by riot police with tear gas. On 6 April 2006 the Supreme Court rejected Besigye's request to dismiss the poll by a vote of four to three, though a majority agreed that there had been electoral irregularities.

References

External links
Electoral Commission
Uganda Elections 2006 Uganda Pulse
Ugandaelections.com
Uganda police shoot rioter dead, BBC News, 15 November 2005
Profiles of 2006 candidates , Daily Monitor, 16 December 2005
Museveni nominated, New Vision, 16 December 2005
Uganda Sets Date for 2006 Election, VOA, 17 December 2005

Uganda
General election
Elections in Uganda
Presidential elections in Uganda
February 2006 events in Africa